A'dia Mathies (born May 18, 1991) is an American professional basketball player, who was drafted in 2013 by the Los Angeles Sparks of the WNBA.

Mathies is a guard, and played her college ball at the University of Kentucky.

Mathies was drafted in the first round by the Sparks, and made the team out of training camp.

Mathies attended Iroquois High School in Louisville, Kentucky.

Kentucky statistics

Source

References

External links
 

1991 births
Living people
All-American college women's basketball players
American women's basketball players
Basketball players from Louisville, Kentucky
Guards (basketball)
Iroquois High School alumni
Kentucky Wildcats women's basketball players
Los Angeles Sparks draft picks
Los Angeles Sparks players
Place of birth missing (living people)
Sportswomen from Kentucky
21st-century American women